Alison White (2 January 1881 – 20 March 1962) was an English cricketer. He played for Gloucestershire between 1913 and 1919.

References

1881 births
1962 deaths
English cricketers
Gloucestershire cricketers
Free Foresters cricketers